The Missisquoi River is a transboundary river of the east shore of Lake Champlain (via Missisquoi Bay), approximately  long, in northern Vermont in the United States and southern Quebec in Canada.

It drains a rural area of the northern Green Mountains along the Canada–US border northeast of Lake Champlain, and an area of Quebec's Eastern Townships. The South Branch rises in Vermont and runs generally from southeast to northwest; the North Branch rises in Lake d'Argent in Eastman, Quebec, and runs from north to south. The North Branch and the South Branch join at Highwater, Quebec, just downriver from North Troy, Vermont.

Etymology
According to US Natural Resources Conservation Service, Missisquoi Soil – Missisquoi is derived from the Abenaki word masipskoik, which means "where there is flint" or "where flint is". The name originates from an Abenaki chert quarry located near Missisquoi Bay on Lake Champlain.

According to the "Commission de toponymie du Québec" (Quebec board of place names), the term "missisquoi" in Abenaki means "multitudes of water birds", which takes on this river all its meaning. The traditional indigenous variant of this toponym is "Wazowategok", meaning "to the river that turns around".

The toponym "Rivière Missisquoi" was formalized on December 5, 1968 at the Commission de toponymie du Québec.

Course
This source is located next to Route 58 and adjacent to Belvidere Mountain. This source proves to be the continuity of the Burgess Branch (coming from the southwest).

  towards the north-east, by collecting the East Branch Missisquoi River (coming from the south-east), then by forming a hook towards the north-west and branches off towards the west at the end of the segment, up to the McAllister Pond outlet (coming from the northwest);
  first towards the north, then towards the north-east by forming a loop towards the north, followed by a mouth towards the south, then curve towards the east, collecting the discharge (coming from the south) from two lakes, to Le Clair Brook (coming from the east);
  to the north by collecting the Snider Brook (coming from the northwest) where the course of the river enters the "Missisquoi & Trout Wild and Scenic River", crossing Route 100, to Mineral Spring Brook (coming from the southeast). Note: This natural park formed by numerous marsh areas continues on each side of the Missisquoi River, up to the Canada-US border;
  first towards the east, then branching north after having made a loop towards the east, collecting the Lilly Branch (coming from the east) and the Taft Brook ( coming from the southwest), forming a loop towards the northwest, then moving towards the northeast to collect the Beetle Brook (coming from the southeast), up to route 100;
  towards the north by collecting a stream (coming from the east), by forming some serpentines and by collecting the Buybee Brook (coming from the west), up to the discharge of Jay Branch (from the west);
  towards the north by forming some serpentines, then curving towards the west and finally towards the north, until route 105;
  towards the north by cutting the railway, bending towards the east, then branching out towards the west by forming a few streamers along the border, up to the Canada-US border.

In upper course, Missisquoi River flows north past Troy and North Troy, crosses Big Falls State Park and the village of Lowell.

  towards the north-west, forming a large detour to collect the Mud stream (coming from the north) and some areas of streamers, passing in front of the village of Highwater where it passes under the road bridge, to the confluence of the Missisquoi River North (coming from the north);
  to the west by forming six curves to the north and a loop to the south, collecting the Ruiter stream (coming from the north), up to the Brock River (from the northwest);
  to the southwest by collecting the Dufour stream (coming from the south-east), the Courser stream (coming from the northwest) and the Davis stream (coming from the northwest), up to the Canada-US border. Note: In this segment, the river flows through Mansonville, Dunkin and the hamlet of Glen Sutton (Sutton).

  south-west in Franklin County, collecting the discharge (coming from the north) from Lac à Jenne, the Lucas Brook (from the southeast), Mountain Brook (from the southeast), Stanhope Brook (from the southeast), Whittaker Brook (from the south), to the confluence of the North Branch Missisquoi River (designated Sutton River in Quebec) (coming from the north);
  to the south collecting the Loveland Brook (coming from the south-east) and the outlet of Guillmettes Pond (coming from the east), to the confluence of the Trout River (coming from the south);
  to the southwest by collecting the Trout Brook (coming from the north), the Tyler Branch (coming from the southeast), the Goodsell Brook (coming from the south), the Morrow Brook (from the southeast) to Black Creek (from the south);
  westwards bending northwards to Interstate 89;
  towards the northwest by forming a loop towards the south to bypass Swanton, until its mouth.

On the west side of Interstate 89 in northwestern Franklin County, it turns to the north, passing through Missisquoi National Wildlife Refuge in its lower  before entering the south end of Missisquoi Bay, an arm of Lake Champlain that straddles the Canada-Vermont border.

Tributaries
Named tributaries in Vermont are: Taft Brook in Westfield, Beetle Brook in Troy, Jay Brook in Jay, Stanhope Brook in Richford, the Trout River in Montgomery, Tyler Branch in Enosburg, Black Creek in Sheldon and Fairfield, and Hungerford Brook in Swanton and Highgate.

History
The Abenaki people used the river as a canoe route between the Lake Champlain drainage and the Saint-François River drainage. The river supports canoe traffic from Lake Champlain to Mansonville, Quebec, where there is a falls. From there, an ancient portage (carrying place) runs  to Perkins Landing on Lake Memphremagog. Abenaki groups met seasonally on the bluffs at Eagle Point in Newport, Vermont, to catch and dry whitefish.

The Missisquoi Valley was among the first areas of Southern Quebec's Eastern Townships to be settled by Loyalist refugees, who came upriver from camps on Missisquoi Bay.

In September 2008 the government of the United States approved a bill to study the Missisquoi and Trout rivers for potential designation as Wild and Scenic Rivers. It passed the House with bi-partisan support, and the rivers could potentially receive permanent protection in the National Wild and Scenic Rivers System. River sections being considered for Wild and Scenic designation are as follows:

 of the upper Missisquoi, Franklin County, including Enosburg, Berkshire and Richford
 of the upper Missisquoi, Orleans County, including Troy, Westfield, Jay and Lowell
 of the Trout River, Franklin County, including Berkshire and Montgomery

A Study Committee composed of local appointees and partner organizations has been evaluating the Wild and Scenic Designation of the upper Missisquoi and Trout rivers. The group's mission is to facilitate the transfer of information among the ten communities through which the rivers flow - Berkshire, Town of Enosburgh, Village of Enosburg Falls, Jay, Lowell, Montgomery, Village of North Troy, Richford, Westfield, and the Town of Troy, and evaluate the potential benefits of the Wild & Scenic designation. At the end of the study in 2012, the committee is scheduled to provide an assessment as to whether the rivers fit designation criteria and whether designation is supported, and make recommendations of voluntary strategies for protection of the rivers' resources.

As a result of the National Park Service and Study Committee recommendation,  of the Missisquoi River and Trout River were added to the National Wild and Scenic River System on December 19, 2014.

Cross-border valley bridge 
The Valley Bridge spans the Missisquoi River on a north-west/south-east axis. This bridge is located on the Canada-US border, between the two customs posts.

The northwest part of this bridge is located in the town of Sutton, near the hamlet of Glen Sutton, in Quebec. The other end of the bridge is located in the municipality of Richford, in the state of Vermont in the United States, near the hamlet of East Richford. This bridge serves sector residents and vacationers transiting between Canada and the United States. This triangular metal beam bridge has two spans: one of 16 m and the other of 46.5 meters.

According to a souvenir plaque affixed at each end of the bridge, the manufacturer of the metal superstructure of the Vallée bridge is the American company Pittsburg Des Moines Steel Co. The substructure was built by Cenedella & Compagny, from Milford to Massachusetts. Construction contracts had been awarded in 1929. This bridge has been listed since 1990 in the National Register of Historic Places in the United States. This metal bridge replaces the old concrete bridge destroyed by the November 1927 flood.

Natural history
In 2016, about 60% of male smallmouth bass bore eggs (androgyny). Pollution from farmland runoff, containing the weedkiller atrazine is a possible suspect.

See also
East Branch Missisquoi River
Brock River
Missisquoi River North
Sutton River
Lake Champlain
Richelieu River
List of rivers of Quebec
List of rivers of Vermont

References

Rivers of Montérégie
Rivers of Vermont
Tributaries of Lake Champlain
Lowell, Vermont
Rivers of Orleans County, Vermont
International rivers of North America
Northern Forest Canoe Trail
Wild and Scenic Rivers of the United States
Vermont placenames of Native American origin